Back to Mine is a series of mix albums, usually mixed by DJs or composers of electronic music. The compilations usually feature artists other than the artist compiling the album, and are based on what the artist would play in their home after a night out, rather than as part of a nightclub session.

The first volume was released in February 1999 by DJ Nick Warren. Since volume seven, the albums have borne the subtitle "A personal collection for after-hours grooving".

Back to Mine was published by the Disco Mix Club, but ended the series with Volume 28. The artwork for Volumes 6–19 and 25–28 were produced by London-based artist Tommy Penton.

Back to Mine returned in 2019 to celebrate their 20th anniversary with Nightmares on Wax. The album was released on 25 January 2019.

Back to Mine releases
Volume 1 – Nick Warren (1 February 1999)
Volume 2 – Dave Seaman (31 May 1999)
Volume 3 – Danny Tenaglia (18 October 1999)
Volume 4 – Groove Armada (6 March 2000)
Volume 5 – Faithless (16 October 2000)
Volume 6 – Everything but the Girl (23 April 2001)
Volume 7 – Morcheeba (23 July 2001)
Volume 8 – Talvin Singh (15 October 2001)
Volume 9 – M. J. Cole (25 March 2002)
Volume 10 – Orbital (24 June 2002)
Volume 11 – New Order (30 September 2002)
Volume 12 – The Orb (27 January 2003)
Volume 13 – Underworld (28 July 2003)
Volume 14 – Tricky (15 September 2003)
Volume 15 – Audio Bullys (10 November 2003)
Volume 16 – Death in Vegas (26 January 2004)
Volume 17 – Richard X (5 April 2004)
Volume 18 – Lamb (5 July 2004)
Volume 19 – Carl Cox (25 October 2004)
Volume 20 – Pet Shop Boys (25 April 2005)
Volume 21 – Adam Freeland (25 July 2005)
Volume 22 – Roots Manuva (24 October 2005)
Volume 23 – Liam Prodigy (30 January 2006)
Volume 24 – Mercury Rev (23 October 2006)
Volume 25 – Röyksopp (2 April 2007)
Volume 26 – Bugz in the Attic (31 July 2007)
Volume 27 – Guillemots (8 October 2007)
Volume 28 – Krafty Kuts (28 January 2008)
Volume 29 – Nightmares on Wax (25 January 2019)
Volume 30 – Jungle (18 October 2019)
Volume 31 – Fatboy Slim (6 November 2020)
Volume 32 – Horse Meat Disco (20 May 2022)
Volume 33 – Tycho (30 Sept 2022)

Similar DJ series
 DJ-Kicks
 Fabriclive
 Late Night Tales
 Another Late Night
 Balance Series

References

External links
Official Back to Mine website
Resident Advisor News - Back to Mine returns in 2019

DJ mix album series